Raja Ampat, or the Four Kings, is an archipelago located off the northwest tip of Bird's Head Peninsula on the island of New Guinea, in Indonesia's Southwest Papua province. It comprises over 1,500 small islands, cays, and shoals surrounding the four main islands of Misool, Salawati, Batanta, and Waigeo, and the smaller island of Kofiau.

The Raja Ampat archipelago straddles the Equator and forms part of Coral Triangle which contains the richest marine biodiversity on earth.

Administratively, the archipelago is part of the province of Southwest Papua. Most of the islands constitute the Raja Ampat Regency, which was separated out from Sorong Regency in 2004. This excludes the southern half of Salawati Island, which is not part of this regency but instead constitutes the Salawati Selatan and Salawati Tengah Districts of Sorong Regency.

History
The name of Raja Ampat (Raja means king, and empat means four) comes from local mythology to that told of a woman who found seven eggs, in one version this woman was Boki Tabai, daughter of Al-Mansur of Tidore and wife to Gurabesi. Three of the seven hatched and became kings who occupy Raja Ampat Islands, the fourth hatched and settled in Waigama but later migrated to Kalimuri (Seram). In another version, the fifth egg hatched into a woman (Pin Take) who later washed away to Biak, married Manar Makeri and later gave birth to Gurabesi. The sixth egg hatched into a spirit, while the seventh egg did not hatch and turned to stone and worshipped as a king in Kali Raja (Wawiyai, Waigeo). Historically the 'four' kingdoms were Waigeo, Salawati, Sailolof, Misool and Waigama. Locally Waigama is not considered one of the Raja Ampat, while Sailolof is not considered one of the Raja Ampat by Tidore.

The first recorded sighting and landing by Europeans of the Raja Ampat Islands was by the Portuguese navigator Jorge de Menezes and his crew in 1526, en route from Biak, the Bird's Head Peninsula, and Waigeo, to Halmahera (Ternate).

Islam first arrived in the Raja Ampat Islands in the 15th century due to political and economic contacts with the Bacan Sultanate. During the 16th and 17th centuries, the Maluku-based Sultante of Tidore had close economic and political ties with the islands especially with Gurabesi. During this period, Islam became firmly established and local chiefs had begun adopting Islam.

As a consequence of these ties, Raja Ampat was considered a part of the Sultanate of Tidore. After the Dutch invaded Maluku, it was claimed by the Netherlands.

The English explorer William Dampier gave his name to Dampier Strait, which separates Batanta island from Waigeo island. To the east, there is a strait that separates Batanta from Salawati. In 1759 Captain William Wilson sailing in the East Indiaman Pitt navigated these waters and named a strait the 'Pitt strait', after his vessel; this was probably the channel between Batanta and Salawati.

Climate

Ecology

Terrestrial
The islands are part of the Vogelkop-Aru lowland rain forests ecoregion. The rain forests that covers the islands is the natural habitat of many species of birds, mammals, reptiles and insects. Two species of bird-of-paradise, the red bird-of-paradise (Paradisaea rubra) and Wilson's bird-of-paradise (Diphyllodes respublica), are endemic to the islands of Waigeo, Gam, and Batanta.

The recently discovered palm tree Wallaceodoxa raja-ampat is endemic to the Raja Ampat Islands.

Marine

Raja Ampat is considered the global center of tropical marine bio-diversity and is referred to as The Crown Jewel of the Bird's Head Seascape, which also includes Cenderawasih Bay and Triton Bay. The region contains more than 600 species of hard corals, equaling about 75 percent of known species globally, and more than 1,700 species of reef fish – including on both shallow  and mesophotic reefs. Compared to similar-sized ecosystems elsewhere in the world, this makes Raja Ampat's biodiversity the richest in the world. Endangered and rare marine mammals such as dugongs, whales (such as blue or/and pygmy blue, bryde's, less known omura's, sperm), dolphins, and orcas occur there.

In the northeast region of Waigeo island, local villagers have been involved in turtle conservation initiatives by protecting nests or relocating eggs of leatherback, olive ridley and hawksbill turtles. Their works are supported by local government, and NGOs.

Raja Ampat Marine Recreation Park was designated in 2009. It is composed of four marine areas – the waters around northern Salawati, Batanta, and southwestern Waigeo, Mayalibit Bay in central Waigeo, the waters southeast of Misool, and waters around the Sembilan Islands north of Misool and west of Salawati.

The oceanic natural resources around Raja Ampat give it significant potential as a tourist area. Many sources place Raja Ampat as one of their top ten most popular places for diving whilst it retains the number one ranking for underwater biodiversity.

According to Conservation International, marine surveys suggest that the marine life diversity in the Raja Ampat area is the highest recorded on Earth. Diversity is considerably greater than any other area sampled in the Coral Triangle composed of Indonesia, Malaysia, Philippines, Papua New Guinea, Solomon Islands, and East Timor. The Coral Triangle is the heart of the world's coral reef biodiversity, making Raja Ampat quite possibly the richest coral reef ecosystems in the world.

The area's massive coral colonies along with relatively high sea surface temperatures, also suggest that its reefs may be relatively resistant to threats like coral bleaching and coral disease, which now jeopardize the survival of other coral ecosystems around the world. The Raja Ampat islands are remote and relatively undisturbed by humans.

The crown-of-thorns starfish eats Raja Ampat's corals, and the destruction this causes among reefs has posed a threat to tourism. The crown-of-thorns starfish, which "can grow around as big as a trash-can lid", has proliferated due to increasing nitrogen in the water from human waste, which in turn causes a spike in phytoplankton on which the starfish feed. In 2019, local divers had begun the task of reducing starfish populations by injecting the starfish with a 10% vinegar solution; the dead starfish can then be eaten by local fish.

The high marine diversity in Raja Ampat is strongly influenced by its position between the Indian and Pacific Oceans, as coral and fish larvae are more easily shared between the two oceans. Raja Ampat's coral diversity, resilience, and role as a source for larval dispersal make it a global priority for marine protection.

1,508 fish species, 537 coral species (a remarkable 96% of all scleractinia recorded from Indonesia are likely to occur in these islands and 75% of all species that exist in the world), and 699 mollusk species, the variety of marine life is staggering. Some areas boast enormous schools of fish and regular sightings of sharks, such as wobbegongs.

Raja Ampat Islands have at least three ponds containing harmless jellyfish, all in the Misool area.

The submarine world around the islands was the subject of the documentary film Edies Paradies 3 (by Otto C. Honegger), which has been broadcast by the Swiss television network Schweizer Fernsehen.

In March 2017 the  cruise ship Caledonian Sky owned by British tour operator Noble Caledonia got caught in a low tide and ran aground in the reef. An evaluation team estimated that  of the reef was destroyed, which will likely result in a compensation claim of $1.28 million – $1.92 million. A team of environmentalists and academics estimated much more substantial damage, with potential losses to Indonesia estimated at $18.6 million and a recovery time for the reef spanning decades.

Population
The main occupation for people around this area is fishing since the area is dominated by the sea. They live in a small colony of tribes that spreads around the area. Although traditional culture still strongly exists, they are very welcoming to visitors. Raja Ampat people are more similar to the surrounding Moluccan people than Papuan people although they still speak Papuan language. The Muslim proportion is much higher compared with other Papuan areas. Although it has to be noted that West Papua province as a whole have larger Muslim population because of the extensive history with the Sultanate of Tidore.

Administration 
Most of the islands make up the Raja Ampat Regency, a regency forming part of Southwest Papua. It came into existence in 2004, prior to which the archipelago was part of Sorong Regency. The southern part of the island of Salawati is not part of the Raja Ampat Regency. Instead, it constitutes the Salawati Selatan and Salawati Tengah Districts of Sorong Regency.

Raja Ampat Regency is subdivided into the following districts (kecamatan):

Note: (a) the Ayau Islands (including Ayau District) lie some distance to the north of Waigeo. (b) Not to be confused with Salawati Tengah District of Sorong Regency, Salawati Tengah District of Rajah Ampat Regency actually forms the southeast portion of Salawati Island.

Taking account of the 2,741 people of Salawati Selatan and Salawati Tengah Districts which are administratively in Sorong Regency, the total population of the archipelago adds up to 68,146 in mid 2021.

There are proposals to divide the current Raja Ampat Regency into three, with Waigeo and its surrounding small islands forming a new North Raja Ampat Regency (Kabupaten Raja Ampat Utara), and with Misool and Kofiau and their surrounding small islands forming a new South Raja Ampat Regency (Kabupaten Raja Ampat Selatan), leaving the residue of the existing Regency to cover the northern part of Salawati Island (the rest of Salawati Island still lies within Sorong Regency) and Batanta Island (which forms Selat Sagawin District).

See also
 Raja Ampat languages

References

External links

 
 Bird's Head Seascape
 Raja Ampat dive sites, map, videos and pictures

 
Coral reefs
Islands of Western New Guinea
Landforms of Southwest Papua
Archipelagoes of Indonesia